The men's double sculls competition at the 1960 Summer Olympics took place at took place at Lake Albano, Italy.

Competition format

This rowing competition consisted of two main rounds (heats and final), as well as a repechage round that allowed teams that did not win their heats to advance to the final. All races were 2,000 metres in distance.

 Heats: Three heats. With 16 boats entered, there were five or six boats per heat. The winner of each heat advanced directly to the final; all other boats went to the repechage.
 Repechage: Three heats. With 13 boats racing in but not winning their initial heats, there were four or five boats per repechage heat. The top boat in each repechage heat advanced to the final, with the remaining boats eliminated.
 Final: The final consisted of the six boats that had won either the preliminary heats or the repechage heats.

Results

Heats

Heat 1

Heat 2

Heat 3

Italy was disqualified for false starting twice.

Repechage

Repechage heat 1

Repechage heat 2

Repechage heat 3

Final

References

Rowing at the 1960 Summer Olympics